Ryland Davies (born 9 February 1943) is a Welsh operatic tenor.

Davies was born in Cwm, Ebbw Vale. He studied at the Royal Manchester College of Music. in 1964 he made his professional debut, at Glyndebourne Festival Opera, where he sang the part of Almaviva in Gioachino Rossini's opera, The Barber of Seville. During his active career he also sang important roles at the Royal Opera House, the Paris Opéra, San Francisco Opera and the Metropolitan Opera. In his prime, the music critic Alan Blyth considers, "he had a sweet-toned, lyrical voice and excellent diction."

References

External links
Interview with Ryland Davies, March 5, 1998

Living people
Welsh operatic tenors
1943 births
People from Ebbw Vale
20th-century Welsh male opera singers